The Tonight Show Band with Doc Severinsen is an album that won the Grammy Award for Best Large Jazz Ensemble Performance in 1986. The album consists of big band songs arranged by Tommy Newsom, Bill Holman, and Dick Lieb performed by members of the band from The Tonight Show with Johnny Carson. The band is conducted by trumpeter Doc Severinsen.

Track listing

Personnel
Credits adapted from AllMusic.

 Doc Severinsen – conductor, flugelhorn, trumpet
 Tommy Newsom – clarinet, flute, alto saxophone, arranger
 John Bambridge – clarinet, flute, alto saxophone, arranger
 Bill Perkins – clarinet, flute, alto saxophone
 Ernie Watts – clarinet, flute, tenor saxophone
 Pete Christlieb – clarinet, flute, tenor saxophone
 Donald Ashworth – clarinet, flute, baritone saxophone, bass saxophone, euphonium
 John Audino – flugelhorn, trumpet
 Conte Candoli – flugelhorn, trumpet
 Maurice Harris – flugelhorn, trumpet
 Snooky Young – flugelhorn, trumpet
 Allen Vizzutti – flugelhorn, trumpet, producer
 Gilbert Falco – trombone
 Bruce Paulson – trombone
 Ernie Tack – bass trombone
 Ross Tompkins – piano
 Joel DiBartolo – bass
 Bob Bain – guitar
 Peter Woodford – guitar
 Ed Shaughnessy – drums

Production

 Jeff Tyzik – producer
 Bernie Grundman – mastering
 Mick Guzauski – engineer, mixing
 Daren Klein – assistant engineer
 Richard McKernan – assistant engineer
 Jesse Peck – assistant engineer

References

1986 albums
Big band albums
Grammy Award for Best Large Jazz Ensemble Album